King Kullen Grocery Co., Inc., is an American supermarket chain based on Long Island. The company is headquartered in Hauppauge, New York, and was founded by Michael J. Cullen on August 4, 1930.

The chain operates 27 locations. It is notable for its title of "America's First Supermarket" as recognized by the Smithsonian Institution. King Kullen meets the criteria of America's First Supermarket because it was “the first to fulfill all five criteria that define the modern supermarket: separate departments; self-service; discount pricing; chain marketing; and volume dealing.”  The Food Marketing Institute has stated that King Kullen “served as the catalyst for a new age in food retailing. The Super Market Institute recognizes that there is dispute regarding which store is America’s first supermarket, but “credits the modern supermarket – ‘the huge self-service, cash-and-carry, one-stop outlet with small markup, large volume, and the all-important parking lot’ – to the Great Depression and a man named Michael Cullen.”  Similarly, Supermarket News noted that "[a]lthough there is some disagreement, the overwhelming majority opinion is that the supermarket was invented by Michael Cullen."  

Supermarket News ranks King Kullen 75th on the list of Top 75 U.S. & Canadian Food Retailers & Wholesalers.

History
King Kullen was founded by Michael J. Cullen, a former Kroger  employee who devised the concept of the modern supermarket. While the branch manager of the Herrin, Illinois branch of the Kroger Grocery & Baking Company stores, managing 94 small stores, Cullen wrote a six-page letter to John Bonham, a Kroger vice-president, proposing a new type of food store with a focus on low prices, cash sales, and without delivery service, in larger stores (at low rents) with ample parking. He described what he envisioned as “monstrous stores, size of some to be about forty feet wide and hundred and thirty to a hundred and sixty feet deep, and they ought to be located one to three blocks off the high rent district with plenty of parking space, and some to be operated as a semi-self-service store – twenty percent service and eighty percent self-service.” In his proposal, Cullen suggested that this new type of store could achieve 10 times the volume and profits of the average Kroger or A&P, making Kroger "the greatest chain grocery concern on the face of the earth."

After Cullen's letter went unanswered, he resigned and moved with his wife Nan and their children to Long Island, where he launched his concept. Cullen leased a vacant garage at 171-06 Jamaica Avenue, on the corner of 171st Street and Jamaica Avenue in Jamaica (Queens), near a busy shopping district. The store, named "King Kullen", opened on August 4, 1930. After an over 80 year presence in New York City, King Kullen left that market in 2011 with the sale of its 3 remaining New York City stores in Eltingville, Graniteville, and Greenridge on Staten Island.

Very soon after opening the first King Kullen, customers came from 100 miles away to shop there. The first store was ten times larger than the Atlantic & Pacific Tea Company stores in the market. The second store was opened a few miles away from the first store, on Jamaica Avenue in Bellaire, Queens. Within two years of opening, the company operated eight stores with sales totaling $2.9 million.  The early stores were 5200 to 6400 square feet big. Within 6 years of opening, King Kullen had 15 locations. By 1952, King Kullen had 30 stores, ranging in size from 10,000 to 15,000 square feet.

Cullen died at Flushing Hospital on April 24, 1936, at the age of 52, from peritonitis following an appendectomy. His widow Nan took over King Kullen, becoming chairman of the board. She was joined by her sons James A. Cullen (then 24) and John B. Cullen (then 15).

In 1937, King Kullen stores began supplying customers with shopping carts. In the 1950s, conveyor belts, air conditioning, automatically opening exterior doors, tile floors (easier to clean than wood), and in-store music systems were introduced. In the 1960s, King Kullen began stocking non-food items. In 1966, King Kullen purchased the nine-store Blue Jay Markets, a Suffolk County based grocery chain.  Blue Jay had been owned and operated by Frank Radau of Smithtown. In 1969, King Kullen bought the Hinsch Produce Co. In 1982, King Kullen introduced in-store bakeries.

King Kullen remains owned and operated by the Cullen family, with second, third and fourth generation family members working for the company. During the 1980s, former New York City Councilman Jack Muratori served as a King Kullen Board member.

In 1995, King Kullen opened Wild by Nature, an independent subsidiary. Wild by Nature is a grocery store marketed as selling wholesome, natural products. Wild by Nature has five locations (Setauket, Huntington, Hampton Bays, Oceanside and West Islip).

Locations

King Kullen operates 29 locations on Long Island, in Nassau and Suffolk counties.

Nine King Kullen stores operate full-service pharmacy departments, with online refills available.

Four King Kullen locations offer online grocery shopping, with delivery and pickup. King Kullen delivers groceries to most of Nassau County, many parts of Suffolk County (including Fire Island), and some neighborhoods in Queens.

Failed acquisition by Stop & Shop
On January 4, 2019, it was announced that Stop & Shop (a division of Ahold Delhaize) would purchase both King Kullen's 32 stores and its 5 Wild by Nature stores. On April 17, 2020, it was announced the deal set to close on April 30, 2020. On June 10, 2020, it was announced that the acquisition deal had been terminated and that King Kullen would remain independent due to “unforeseen changes in the marketplace”.

Headquarters

King Kullen's first headquarters was established at its second store, on Jamaica Avenue in Bellaire, Queens. The offices were located in the northwest corner of the store, in a converted garage. In 1940, a combination warehouse and office was built at 178-02 Liberty Avenue, Queens (warehouse on ground level; offices on upper floor). In 1961, King Kullen built a 95,000 square foot warehouse on Prospect Avenue in Westbury, New York, and moved the Liberty Avenue Headquarters to that location. In May 2000, King Kullen moved its corporate headquarters from 1194 Prospect Avenue, Westbury, to a three-story building at 185 Central Avenue, Bethpage, New York. In December 2020, King Kullen moved out of its Bethpage headquarters after selling the building to a White Plains venture capital firm and moved to a new, rented office in Hauppauge.

In popular culture
Adam Sandler referenced King Kullen in the 2018 Netflix comedy The Week Of.
The supermarket is also known for its celebrity clientele in its Hamptons stores.

References

External links
Official website

Supermarkets of the United States
Companies based in Nassau County, New York
Bethpage, New York
American companies established in 1930
Retail companies established in 1930
1930 establishments in New York City